Admiral Arthur W. Radford High School, known as Radford High School, is a coeducational college preparatory public high school in the City and County of Honolulu, Hawaii.

Basic information 
The school is named after Navy Admiral Arthur William Radford who served as Commander-in-Chief of the United States Pacific Command after WWII. Radford High School was established in 1957 and graduated its first senior class in June 1960. It is fully accredited by the Western Association of Schools and Colleges. The school is located on 27 acres of land on Salt Lake Boulevard, outside of the Aliamanu Military Reservation. The campus has a bronze sculpture entitled Striving for Excellence by Jan Gordon Fisher. Radford serves a community of approximately 30,000 people. Its students are ethnically diverse and about 63% military dependents, resulting in a yearly transiency rate of about one third.

Boundaries
The school community is located within a one-mile radius of Joint Base Pearl Harbor–Hickam, Foster Village and Aliamanu. Radford High School's boundary encompasses the following civilian housing areas: Aliamanu, Alii Plantation, Crosspointe, and Foster Village.
It encompasses the following military housing areas: Hokulani, Ohana Nui, Hickam Air Force Base, Catlin Park, Ford Island, Hale Moku, Halsey Terrace, Little Makalapa, Makalapa, Moanalua Terrace, Pearl Harbor Shipyard Quarters, and most of Aliamanu Military Reservation Housing.

The Military Youth Advisory Council (MYAC)
MYAC is the school's primary community group and is composed of school leaders, three military commands, Family Service Centers, business and civilian leaders, PTSO representatives, students, and the community college liaisons. The council addresses most issues of its transient population, meeting once a month on the Radford campus. It is a highly functional, comprehensive partnership which has resulted in many exemplary programs and improvements for Radford students and has solved many critical campus/community issues.

School complex area information 
Radford High School is part of the Hawaii Department of Education Aiea-Moanalua-Radford Complex Area in the Central Oahu District along with Aiea High School and Moanalua High School.

The Radford Complex consists of 7 elementary schools, 1 middle school, and 1 high school:
 Aliamanu Elementary School
 Hickam Elementary School
 Makalapa Elementary School
 Mokulele Elementary School
 Nimitz Elementary School
 Pearl Harbor Elementary School
 Pearl Harbor Kai Elementary School
 Aliamanu Middle School
 Radford High School

Curriculum 
Radford offers various co-curricular activities. These include student government, class level activities, honor societies, service clubs, special interest clubs, and interscholastic athletics.

Academics 
Radford offers courses such as Japanese language, introduction to industrial engineering, forensic science, entrepreneurship, marine science, language arts courses for the gifted and talented, two advanced placement courses in each core area, the Multimedia Program under the Arts and Communications Career Pathway, a Junior Reserve Officers' Training Corps program, a Freshman Academy, a Culinary Arts Academy, a Building and Construction Academy, and many other electives.

Radford maintains several comprehensive student support programs. The Student Transition Center provides new student orientation, a "lunch buddy" program, and a tutorial program for those students who need extra study assistance. The Discovery Center assists students with job preparation and placement. The College and Career Resource Center helps students with college searches and applications.

The school offers a music program that includes a concert band, made up of less experienced players, a symphonic band, for those with more training, an orchestra, a chorus, a guitar class, and a marching band.  The Radford "Rams" Marching Band began in the early 1970s and continued through the early '90s when it ceased to exist.  In 2008, the new music director,  Nicole Sherlock, revived the marching band and students voted to change the name to Radford "Red Brigade" Marching Band. By 2013, the drumline had established itself as one of the top drumlines in the state of Hawaii.

Navy Junior Reserve Officers Training Corps Unit 
The Navy Junior Reserve Officers Training Corps unit offers extracurricular activities such as armed and unarmed drill, FOX team, and a PT team among other activities within the unit. Students enrolled in the program take Naval Science courses and have opportunities to attend many functions on the nearby Joint Base Pearl Harbor–Hickam. The battalion is currently headed by Senior Naval Science Instructor LCDR. Harrison Depondicchello (USN).

Sports

Notable alumni 
 Melveen Leed (1961) – singer, musician, vocal instructor
 Craig MacIntosh (1962) – illustrator of Sally Forth (syndicated strip) and Doodles (comic strip)
 Velega Savali (1962) – politician, Treasurer of American Samoa 2005-2008
 Bette Midler (1963) – singer, actress, comedian
 Jim Phillips (1964) – three time U.S. Champion surfer, 1998 Surfing Hall of Fame inductee, designer/builder of custom surfboards
 Judith Wolski (1965) – Miss Hawaii USA 1966 and top 15 semi-finalist (8th place) Miss USA 1966
 Brian Shul (1966) – USAF fighter pilot, SR-71 Blackbird pilot, published author and photographer
 Jeris White (1970) – NFL football player, corner back, Miami Dolphins, Tampa Bay Buccaneers and Super Bowl XVII champion Washington Redskins
 Burl Burlingame (1971) – journalist, historian, published author
 Gary Hooser (1972) – Kaua'i County Council member 1998–2002; Hawaii Senate Majority Leader and State Senator representing the Islands of Kaua'i and Ni'ihau 2003–2010
 Celita De Castro (1972) – Miss Hawaii USA 1977 and top 12 semi-finalist (9th place) Miss USA 1977
 Loretta Ables Sayre (1976) – singer, actress, entertainer
 Mark "Hawkeye" Louis Rybczyk (1979) – disc jockey on Dallas/Fort Worth country music radio station KSCS 96.3 FM
 Ken Niumatalolo (1983) – U.S. Naval Academy Football – Head Coach (2007-2022)
 Brian Norwood (1983) – Baylor University Assistant Head Coach (2008–2015), University of Tulsa Co-defensive coordinator (2015–2017), Kansas State University - Co-defensive coordinator and defensive backs coach (2018), Navy - Co-defensive coordinator and safeties coach (2019)
 Stephen Akina (1988) – classical pianist, television and film score composer
 Ashley Lelie (1998) – NFL football player, wide receiver Denver Broncos, Atlanta Falcons, San Francisco 49ers, and Oakland Raiders
 Wayne Hunter (1999) – NFL football player, offensive lineman Seattle Seahawks, Jacksonville Jaguars, New York Jets, and St. Louis Rams
 Ciana Pelekai (2018) – Miss Hawaii Teen America and Miss Teen America 2017, contestant on "America's Got Talent" and "The Voice"

References

External links 
 Official Radford High School Website
 Radford High School PTSO
 Radford Registration Information
 Public School Review Profile
 The RamPage
 RamPage Broadcasting
 Celebrating Radford's 50th Anniversary

Public high schools in Honolulu County, Hawaii
Educational institutions established in 1957
1957 establishments in Hawaii